Chilgatherium ('Chilga beast' after the locality in which it was found) is the earliest and most primitive  representative of the family Deinotheriidae.  It is known from late Oligocene (27- to 28-million-year-old) fossil teeth found in the Ethiopian district of Chilga.  

So far, only a few molar teeth have been found, but these are distinct enough that this animal can be identified with confidence. The teeth differ from those of Prodeinotherium, Deinotherium, and the various barytheres in various details, enough to show that this is a distinct type of animal, and has been placed in its own subfamily. It is not known if it shared the distinctive downward-curving tusks on the lower jaw that the later deinotheres had.

Chilgatherium disappeared prior to the Early Miocene, where Prodeinotherium occurred, instead.

References

 Gugliotta, Guy (2003) Six New Species of Prehistoric Mammals Discovered in Africa Find Proves Elephants Originated on Continent, Scientist Says, The Washington Post, Thursday, December 4, 2003; Page A02
 Sanders, W.J., Kappelman, J. & Rasmussen, D. T., (2004), New large-bodied mammals from the late Oligocene site of Chilga, Ethiopia.  Acta Palaeontologica Polonica Vol. 49, no.3, pp. 365–392 pdf

Deinotheriids
Oligocene proboscideans
Prehistoric placental genera
Oligocene mammals of Africa
Fossil taxa described in 2004